The House Of Apples & Eyeballs is a collaborative album by Black Moth Super Rainbow and The Octopus Project.

Track listing
 "Spiracle" – 3:51
 "Marshmallow Window" – 1:55
 "It Hurts to Shoot Lazers from Your Fingers, but It's Necessary" – 0:04
 "Lollipopsichord" – 2:27
 "Elq Milq" – 4:37
 "All the Friends You Can Eat" – 2:07
 "Copying Soup onto Sexy Birdy" – 0:29
 "Psychic Swelling" – 2:37
 "Lemon Lime Face" – 0:41
 "Helium Tea" – 0:49
 "Beds" – 1:40
 "Runite Castles" – 3:39
 "Tony Face" – 3:30
 "Royal Firecracker Teeth" – 1:40
 "Foxy and the Weight of the World" – 6:15

References

2006 albums
Black Moth Super Rainbow albums
The Octopus Project albums